The Utica Pros was an American basketball team based in Utica, New York that was a member of the American Basketball League.

Year-by-year

Basketball teams in New York (state)
Defunct basketball teams in the United States
1950 establishments in New York (state)
1951 disestablishments in New York (state)
Basketball teams established in 1950
Sports clubs disestablished in 1951
Utica, New York